John McKissick (September 25, 1926 – November 28, 2019) was a head football coach of Summerville High School in Summerville, South Carolina. In 2012, he became the first American football coach in history (high school, college, or professional) to win 600 career games. His 600th win came against Summerville's Ashley Ridge High School. Up until 2013, he had never missed a game in 62 years and was the longest serving high school football coach of all time. He led Summerville to 10 state championships. With 621 wins, McKissick holds the record for most wins by a football coach at any level. He graduated from Kingstree Senior High School in Kingstree, South Carolina, then went to Presbyterian College for two years before being drafted into the Army (as a paratrooper). He returned to Presbyterian to graduate with a degree in economics in 1951. He then worked for his father for a while before finally getting the coaching job at Summerville High.
He coached all three of his grandsons, Richard and Joe Call, and Donny McElveen. He was elected to the National High School Hall of Fame in 1990.
After McKissick's retirement ahead of the 2015 season, grandson Joe who had been his offensive coordinator was named head coach.

McKissick was mentioned in Pat Conroy's The Prince of Tides novel in 1986 and the film that was released five years later.  In Conroy's novel, South of Broad, McKissick is given dialogue in a fictional game played between Summerville High School and Peninsula High School.

References

External links

Summerville High School Athletics Department
NFLHS.COM – Legends of HS Football: John McKissick
USATODAY.com – Football coach all alone at brink of 500 wins
2005 High School Football Preview
USATODAY.com – Winningest football coach at 532 and not about to stop

1926 births
2019 deaths
People from Kingstree, South Carolina
People from Summerville, South Carolina
Players of American football from South Carolina
American football fullbacks
Brevard Tornados football players
Presbyterian Blue Hose football players
Military personnel from South Carolina
Coaches of American football from South Carolina
High school football coaches in South Carolina
United States Army soldiers
Paratroopers